The Large Novosibirsk Planetarium is a planetarium in Oktyabrsky District of Novosibirsk, Russia. It was opened in 2012. One of the two planetariums of the city.

The planetarium is located on Klyuch-Kamyshenskoye Plateau, which is the highest place in Novosibirsk.

History
The idea of the establishment of the planetarium appeared in 2006 after the first Siberian Astronomical Forum (SibAstro).

The Novosibirsk Planetarium was officially opened on February 8, 2012.

Description
The planetarium has two floors. Film studio and administrative premises are located on the ground floor. 120-seat star hall is located on the second floor.

Next to the planetarium is a tower with a Foucault pendulum, its length is 15 m.

External links
 Novosibirsk Planetarium. Новосибирский Планетарий. Novosibdom.ru
 Pointing to the sky with a telescope: how to find the Novosibirsk Planet. RIA Novosti. Тыча в небо телескопом: как найти планету "Новосибирск". РИА Новости. October 8, 2013.

Buildings and structures in Novosibirsk
Tourist attractions in Novosibirsk
Oktyabrsky District, Novosibirsk
Planetaria in Russia